The 1953–54 season was Dinamo Zagreb's eighth season in the Yugoslav First League. They finished 1st in the league, winning their second league title, with one point ahead of runners-up Partizan.

Players

Squad
Note: The following is the full list of players who appeared in league matches for Dinamo in the 1953–54 season. However, only players who started at least 10 league games are included in historic records as having been members of the championship-winning squad, according to NK Dinamo Zagreb's 1945–1985 official almanac. Those players are listed in bold.

Statistics
The following table lists appearances and goals of all players who represented Dinamo in the 1953–54 season. Only league matches and goals are taken into account. Dionizije Dvornić and Vladimir Čonč are the only two players who appeared in all 26 league matches of the season.

Yugoslav First League

Matches

Classification

See also
1953–54 Yugoslav First League

1953-54
Yugoslav football clubs 1953–54 season
1953-54